Taxi Lovers is a 2005 Italian film directed by Luigi Di Fiore and produced by	Massimiliano Caroletti and Alberto Rossi.

Plot
Massimo, a taxi driver, meets Giovanna during a night ride: a relationship will be created between the two.

Cast 
 Paolo Gasparini: Marco
 Edoardo Leo: Massimo
 Massimiliano Caroletti: Carlo
 Elisabetta Cavallotti: Giovanna
 Sergio Fiorentini: Alberto
 Alberto Di Stasio: Anghelos
 Ettore Bassi: ispettore
 Valentina Chico: Linda
 Giusy Valeri: Maria
 Alessandro Cremona: Nurri
 Piero Leri: Luca Mari
 Alberto Rossi: barman

Awards
 2005 BAFF (B.A. Film Festival) - Casbot best producer

References

External links

2005 films
Italian thriller films
2000s Italian films
2000s Italian-language films